Balumath is a community development block located in the Latehar district of Jharkhand. Latehar, the district headquarters, is 23 km west of Balumath. It is one of the seven community development blocks in the Latehar district. It has a total of 174 villages which include Bariyatu and Herhanj. It has 27 panchayats which is the highest among the developmental blocks of the Latehar district.

Ranchi, the state capital, is around 82 km south-east. Tori Railway Station is the nearest railway and Ranchi Airport is the nearest airport. Chandwa is about 19 km south-west. Kanti Waterfalls is a nearby tourist destination.

Business centers

A Bajaj showroom named Sonali Bajaj, a hero showroom named National Automobile, TVS showroom Laxmi Parwati Automobile, and a Honda showroom Laxmi Automobiles. There are also many hotels and restaurants which provide basic accommodations. There are many construction and hardware shops.

References

1. https://web.archive.org/web/20090425150722/http://latehar.nic.in/overview.htm

Latehar district
Community development blocks in Jharkhand
Community development blocks in Latehar district
Cities and towns in Latehar district